The Bristol City Stadium (tentative name)  was a proposed football stadium, announced in November 2007, which would be built on land at Ashton Vale, Bristol, England, and would replace Ashton Gate Stadium as the home stadium of Bristol City F.C. Due to legal issues, the club cancelled the project, instead deciding to renovate Ashton Gate.

Design
The stadium was intended to have a capacity of 30,000 spectators. HOK, the architects that designed Wembley Stadium, Cardiff's Millennium Stadium and Arsenal F.C.'s Emirates Stadium, was retained to design the stadium. As a preliminary part of the planning process, public consultations took place in December 2008 and February 2009.

A survey carried out by Bristol City Supporters Trust reported that 95% of fans supported the move to a new stadium, but that there were concerns about the acoustics of the new stadium and the need for it to have a distinctive "Bristol" feel. In December 2009, the Football Association announced that Bristol would be one of the host cities should England win the 2018 World Cup Bid. The England bid, however, was unsuccessful.

Financing
In April 2009, Bristol City owner and chairman Steve Lansdown sold a stake of 4.7% in Hargreaves Lansdown for a sum of £47.2million, towards the cost of building the stadium, reducing his stake in the business to 22.9%. Lansdown commented that the residual costs of construction would be paid for by a combination of the sale of: Ashton Gate, debentures, and the naming rights for the new stadium.

Name
Tentatively named the Bristol City Stadium, it is also referred to as Ashton Vale, which is the name of the area in which it is planned to be built. Lansdown has commented that he would not follow Dave Whelan, JJB Sports founder and Wigan Athletic owner, in naming the stadium after his business, Hargreaves Lansdown. He said "I don’t want my name near the stadium. It’ll be more like Emirates Stadium."

Planning history
With Bristol City and Bristol Rovers both wanting bigger capacities by the turn of the 21st century, the city council had been exploring the possibility of building a new stadium for both of the city's football teams, as well as its rugby team, but the plans were cancelled and Rovers later withdrew their interest in relocating to a new site, instead concentrating on plans to expand the Memorial Stadium, which they have shared with the rugby team since 1996.

Local residents, backed by an independent inspector, have asked that the land be declared a town green. The city council decided in June 2011 that the site should split with the south being given village green status, and the north being free for the stadium to be constructed. Despite the council's decision, local residents will seek a review of the decision.

See also
 Development of stadiums in English football

References

External links
CABE Review - Ashton Gateway

Bristol City F.C.
Unbuilt football venues in England
Sports venues in Bristol